Bottled at Source is a compilation album by British band Turin Brakes, released in 2009.

Track listing

Disc 1 
Pain Killer - from the album Ether Song
Underdog (Save Me) - from the album The Optimist LP
Emergency 72 - from the album The Optimist LP
Long Distance - from the album Ether Song
The Door - from the album The Optimist LP
5 Mile (These Are the Days) - from the single 5 Mile (These Are the Days) and the album Ether Song
Feeling Oblivion - from the album The Optimist LP
Average Man - from the album Ether Song
Over and Over - from the album JackInABox
Mind Over Money [Extended Radio Edit] - from the single Mind Over Money
Fishing for a Dream - from the album JackInABox
Dark on Fire - from the album Dark on Fire
Red Moon - from the album JackInABox
Something in my Eye - from the album Dark on Fire
Stalker - from the album Dark on Fire
Last Chance - from the album Dark on Fire
Ether Song - from the album Ether Song

Bonus Disc 
Underdog (Sally) [Demo]
Balham to Brooklyn [BBC Scotland Session] - from the single Underdog (Save Me)
Mind Over Money [Demo]
Everybody Knows [7" version] - from the single Emergency 72
Lost and Found [Home Recording] - from the single Long Distance
Where's My Army? [Home Recording] - from the single Pain Killer
So Long [L.A. Demo] - from the single Average Man
Moonlight Mile - from the album Late Night Tales
Atlas of the World - from the single Fishing for a Dream
Asleep with the Fireflies [Live at the Palladium] - from the album Live at the Palladium
Capsule - from the EP Something Out of Nothing
Love Is All You Deserve - From The Red Moon EP
The Seagull
Time Machine
Cumulous Clouds
Rise
Nessun Dorma [XFM Session, Sept 2007]

2009 greatest hits albums
Turin Brakes albums
EMI Records compilation albums
Astralwerks compilation albums